Khalaf Al-Khatri (born 1 January 1964) is an Omani sport shooter. He competed in the 1992 and 1996 Summer Olympics.

References

ISSF Profile

1964 births
Living people
Shooters at the 1992 Summer Olympics
Shooters at the 1996 Summer Olympics
Omani male sport shooters
Olympic shooters of Oman
Shooters at the 1994 Asian Games
Shooters at the 1998 Asian Games
Shooters at the 2002 Asian Games
Shooters at the 2006 Asian Games
Shooters at the 2010 Asian Games
People from Ad Dakhiliyah Governorate
Asian Games competitors for Oman
20th-century Omani people
21st-century Omani people